Cherry Hill (also Egger) is an unincorporated community in northeast Polk County, Arkansas, United States. The community is on Arkansas Highway 88 approximately 13 miles east of Mena. The Ouachita River flows past south of the site.

Bob Dorough (1923-2018), composer and musician, was born in Cherry Hill.

Notes

Unincorporated communities in Polk County, Arkansas
Unincorporated communities in Arkansas